Jadhima known as al-Abrash or al-Waddah (both surnames meaning "the Leper") was a 3rd-century Arab king.

Biography
From this it appears that he reigned some time in the second half of the 3rd century.

The sources differ on Jadhima's origin and parentage: some consider him an Azdite who married into the Tanukhid family by marrying the sister of Malik ibn Zuhayr ibn Amr ibn Fahm, while others consider the Fahmids also as Azdites, and name Jadhima as the son of Malik Ibn Fahm (the brother of Amr ibn Fahm). The southern Arabic tradition on the other hand is entirely different, making Jadhima the son of Amr ibn Rabi'a ibn Nasr, who was settled by the Persian king in al-Hira. According to Gustav Rothstein, however, the southern Arabic tradition is evidently a later invention.

In medieval historical sources and literature, Jadhima is portrayed as a pivotal figure in the pre-Islamic history of the Arabs, especially in the context of the Roman–Persian Wars over supremacy in the Middle East. However, the historical kernel around which these traditions is impossible to reconstruct today. He is also credited with a number of firsts, such as being the first Arab to use candles, wear sandals, and build catapults.

Numerous traditions around him and his companions and family became the subject of poetry and proverbial wisdom. Such episodes include his boon companions, the marriage of his sister Riqash to Adi, and his marriage to, and death by, al-Zabba (Zenobia). Some fragments of poems are also attributed to him, and he is listed among the pre-Islamic poets by later anthologists.  He was succeeded by his nephew Amr ibn Adi, the son of Riqash and Adi.

References

Sources
 
 
 

3rd-century Arabs
3rd-century monarchs in the Middle East
Pre-Islamic Arab kings
Leprosy
Mythological kings
Tanukhids